Bradley Leo Buckley (born September 14, 1966) is a Texas veterinarian and Republican member of the Texas House of Representatives for House District 54, which includes part of Bell County and all of Lampasas County in Central Texas.

Education
Buckley earned his Bachelor of Arts degree in 1989 and his Doctor of Veterinary Medicine in 1993 from Texas A&M University.

Career
Since 1994, he has been a veterinarian having his own practice in Killeen, Texas.

Texas House of Representatives 
On May 22, 2018, Buckey defeated incumbent Scott Cosper in the Republican primary runoff election for the Texas House District 54. On November 6, 2018, Buckley won the general election with 53.8% of the vote; Kathy Richerson, his Democratic opponent, received 46.2%.

In 2021, Buckley introduced legislation that would prohibit companies that produce meat-like substances made from plants from using the terms "meat" in their labelling. Livestock companies and their lobbying organizations supported the bill, while plant-based food companies like Beyond Meat and Impossible Burgers described the bill as a violation of free speech.

References

Living people
People from Killeen, Texas
21st-century American politicians
Republican Party members of the Texas House of Representatives
Texas A&M University alumni
Male veterinarians
American veterinarians
1966 births